John Jacob Livingood (March 7, 1903 – July 21, 1986) was an American nuclear physicist specialising in the design of particle accelerators. With Glen Seaborg he discovered and characterized a number of new radioisotopes useful for nuclear medicine, including cobalt-60, iodine-131 and iron-59.

Biography 
Livingood was born in Cincinnati, Ohio. He studied at Princeton University, gaining a Ph.D. in 1929 on the arc spectrum of platinum. He taught at Princeton and authored the introductory textbook Experimental Atomic Physics with Gaylord Harnwell. In 1932 he began research working alongside Seaborg at the Radiation Laboratory at the University of California, Berkeley led by Ernest Lawrence. Livingood was part of a team that identified over a dozen new radioisotopes.

From 1938 he worked on the construction of a new cyclotron at Harvard University, before joining the secret Radio Research Laboratory in 1942 to carry out military research.

In 1945 he joined Collins Radio Company working on new cyclotrons for the Argonne and Brookhaven National Laboratories. From 1952 he led the design and construction at Argonne of the Zero Gradient Synchrotron.

In 1961 he authored the book Principles of Cyclic Particle Accelerators and in 1969 The Optics of Dipole Magnets.

Livingood died July 21 1986 aged 83 from complications following a stroke in 1980. He was survived by his wife and two children.

Books

References 

1903 births
1986 deaths
American nuclear physicists
Scientists from Cincinnati
Princeton University alumni
Princeton University faculty
University of California, Berkeley faculty
Harvard University faculty
Argonne National Laboratory people